Racing-Club de Revière-Pilote (RC Rivière-Pilote) is multi-sports club from Rivière-Pilote, Martinique.

RC Rivière-Pilote participates in football, handball, basketball, and athletics.

However, the most prominent and important sport of the club, is football. RC Rivière-Pilote is considered one of the better football clubs of Martinique.

Founded in 1961, the main football team of RC Rivière-Pilote has been playing in Division d'Honneur since 1974. The Martinican politician, Alfred Marie-Jeanne was the president of RC Rivière Pilote for 23 years, from 1967 to 1990.

The current president of the club is Marcel Pujar.

Stadiums
For their matches, RC Rivière-Pilote plays in Stade Alfred Marie-Jeanne (formerly known as Stade En Camée) which has a capacity of 3,000. The club trains in Stade du bourg.

Achievements
Martinique Championnat National: 5
 1982, 1983, 2008, 2010, 2012.

Coupe de la Martinique: 4
 1978, 1981, 2011, 2013.

 Trophée du Conseil Général: 1
 2012.

Ligue des Antilles: 1
2006

Performance in CONCACAF competitions
CONCACAF Champions' Cup: 2 appearances
1984 – unknown results
1989 – Third Round (Caribbean Zone) – Lost against  FC Pinar del Río 3–2 on aggregate (stage 4 of 5)

The club in the French football structure
French Cup: 2 appearances
1977/78, 1981/82

References

External links
 2007/08 Club info at Antilles-Foot
 Official Website – le site officiel du Racing Club Rivière-Pilote

Football clubs in Martinique
Association football clubs established in 1961
1961 establishments in Martinique